Rolando García may refer to:
Rolando García (Chilean footballer) (born 1942)
Rolando García (Paraguayan footballer) (born 1990)
Rolando García (Argentinian scientist and epistemologist), see Jean Piaget